The 1996 British Speedway Championship was the 36th edition of the British Speedway Championship. The Final took place on 28 April at Brandon in Coventry, England. The Championship was won by Joe Screen, who won the 'A Final' ahead of Chris Louis, Carl Stonehewer and Kelvin Tatum.

Final 
28 April 1996
 Brandon Stadium, Coventry

{| width=100%
|width=50% valign=top|

Qualifying

A Final

B Final

C Final

See also 
 British Speedway Championship

References 

British Speedway Championship
Great Britain